Hot Milk is a 2016 novel by British author Deborah Levy. It follows the story of mother, Rose, and daughter, Sofia, who embark on a journey to a Spanish clinic in search of a medical cure for Rose's paralysis.

Plot 
Rose's paralysis confines her to a wheelchair and limits Sofia's freedoms. The proprietor of the clinic, Gómez, is charismatic but may be of questionable skill. While Rose undergoes treatment, 25-year-old Sofia becomes obsessed with Ingrid, a seamstress. Later, Sofia visits her father in Athens, from whom she has been estranged, and spends time with his new wife and daughter. Athens seems to be in a state of collapse, and the novel pictures both Greece and Spain in the throes of economic and political turmoil. Sofia is an anthropologist by training, and this informs her perspective on events.

Critical reception 
The novel received generally positive reviews. In The New York Times, Sarah Lyall described Sofia, the main character as "interesting and surprising."

Nominations
2016 Man Booker Prize, shortlisted.

References

2016 British novels
Hamish Hamilton books
Novels set in Athens
Novels set in Spain
This novel is set to be a major motion picture starring Jessie Buckley.